Liu Xuyi (13 May 1913 – 10 November 2018) was a Chinese historian, scholar, writer and expert on US studies.

Biography
Liu was born into a poor intellectual family in Huangpi District of Wuhan, Hubei, on 13 May 1913, a year after the fall of the Qing dynasty. 

In 1929 he attended the Hanyang No. 12 Middle School and then Hubei Provincial High School. 

In 1933 he was accepted to Tsinghua University, where he majored in sociology.

In 1945 he arrived in the United States at the age of 32 to begin his education at the University of Chicago in  Chicago, Illinois. He returned to China after graduation and worked as an associate professor in Wuhan University. 

In 1949 he joined the New Democratic Education Association, a Communist Party's underground organization.

After the founding of the Communist State, he became secretary general of Wuhan University. He joined the Communist Party of China in 1953. Liu retired in 1989.

On 10 November 2018, he died of cerebrovascular disease in Wuhan, Hubei.

Personal life
Liu met Zhou Shiying in 1935, when he attended a meeting held by the Hubei Federation of High School Graduates. They married in Chongqing.

Work

References

1913 births
2018 deaths
Chinese centenarians
Deaths from cerebrovascular disease
Historians from Hubei
Men centenarians
Tsinghua University alumni
University of Chicago alumni
Writers from Wuhan
Academic staff of Wuhan University